Tseung Kwan O Industrial Estate (branded as ) is located in the southeast of the Tseung Kwan O New Town, Sai Kung District in Hong Kong.

Location
Tseung Kwan O Industrial Estate has an area of 75 ha (other sources mention 86 ha and 95 ha). It is located 3 km south east of Tseung Kwan O New Town. The Estate has a marine frontage and was partly built on reclaimed land. Reclamation and servicing work were completed in 1997.

The former island of Fat Tong Chau is located at the southwest of the Estate. The South East New Territories Landfill (SENT) is located at the south of the Estate and Fat Tong Chau.

Tenants
The headquarters of Television Broadcasts Limited (TVB), known as TVB City, is located in the Industrial Estate at 77 Chun Choi Street, and broadcasts the Cantonese-language TV station TVB Jade and the English-language TVB Pearl.

References

External links

 

Tseung Kwan O
Manufacturing in Hong Kong
Industrial estates in Hong Kong
Hong Kong
1994 establishments in Hong Kong